Guy IX de Laval (c. 1270 – 22 January 1333) was a member of the House of Laval. He was Seigneur de Laval and d'Acquigny, of Beaumont-du-Gâtinais, Viscomte de Rennes, Comte de Caserte in Campania and Baron de Vitré.

Family

Guy IX was the son of Guy VIII de Laval and Isabelle de Beaumont-Gâtinais

In 1297 he married Béatrix de Gavre, countess of Falkemberg, only daughter of Rasès de Gavre.

Children:
 Guy X de Laval, who married Béatrix de Bretagne, daughter of Arthur II, Duke of Brittany, on 2 March 1315
 Rasès de Laval, lord of Morhem in Flanders, died after 1348, without known offspring
 Foulques de Laval, progenitor of the lords of Challouyau in Burgundy and Retz
 Pierre de Laval, bishop of Rennes, died 1357
 Jean de Laval, knight, lord of Passy-sur-Marne, who married Jeanne de Chemillé (died childless), and Aliénor Le Bigot de la Bérardière
 Isabeau (died 1322), who married Péan de La Roche-Bernard (died 18 June 1347 - Battle of La Roche-Derrien), Lord of Lohéac
 Catherine de Laval, wife of Gérard IV de Retz
 Jeanne de Laval, nun at Saint-Georges de Rennes.

References

Sources

Guy 09 Laval
Laval, Guy 09
Viscounts of France
Year of birth uncertain